The Cégep Marie-Victorin is a French public college in Montreal, Quebec, Canada. It is located at 7000 rue Marie-Victorin in the borough of Montréal-Nord.

Cégep is an acronym for Collège d'enseignement général et professionnel, generally translated into English as vocational college.

Universities and colleges in Montreal
Colleges in Quebec
Quebec CEGEP
Montréal-Nord